Joseph Twadell Shipley (August 19, 1893 – May 11, 1988) was an American drama critic, author, editor and associate professor of English at Yeshiva College in New York City.

Early life
Shipley graduated from City College in 1912.
He received a Ph.D. in comparative literature from Columbia in 1931 with the thesis The quest for literature; a survey of literary criticism and the theories of the literary forms.

Academia
Shipley taught English at Stuyvesant High School from 1914 to 1957, and also taught at City College and Brooklyn College.
He was secretary to the president of Yeshiva college, assistant professor and then associate professor at Yeshiva college in the period 1928 to 1944 - "a member of the first faculty of Yeshiva College."

Literature
Shipley became drama critic of The Call in 1918. The Call later became The New Leader and Shipley was drama critic in this paper until 1962. His theater reviews were broadcast on the radio station WEVD in New York on his program First Nights from 1940 to 1982. He was president of the New York Drama Critics’ Circle 1952-1954 and was secretary for the group for 16 years, until 1982. 
 
He was the author or editor of 27 books. He published a book about  Eugene O'Neill in 1928 and was among the first to write about O'Neill. His last book: Origins of English Words, was published in 1984 by Johns Hopkins University Press.

Shipley was an honorary overseas member of the Critics Circle in London, and was in 1977 awarded the Townsend Harris Medal by  City College  for his distinguished career in criticism.

Bibliography 
The bibliography is based on books registered with Library of Congress Online Catalog.

Author

Editor, translator and introductions

Legacy
Beyond his accomplishments in authoring, editing and translating 27 books, and his legacy at Yeshiva College, the New York Times obituary wrote about leaving behind his wife, sister and children, along with 19 grandchildren and 9 great-grandchldren.

References

External links 
Publisher-supplied biographical information about contributor(s) for The origins of English words : a discursive dictionary of Indo-European roots / Joseph T. Shipley. in the Library of Congress catalog.
"Joseph T. Shipley" in WorldCat library catalog
Archives containing material written by Joseph T. Shipley
The development of Henrik Ibsen in George Bernard Shaw; a comparison and contrast. Shipley, Joseph T. (Joseph Twadell), 1893-1988. Masters essay. Columbia University. 1915. Archive registered with ArchiveGrid.
 Papers, 1917-1939. Shipley, Joseph T. (Joseph Twadell), 1893-1988. New York State Historical Documents, miscellaneous correspondence, poems, clippings, and printed material. Archive registered with ArchiveGrid.
 New Leader (New York, N.Y. : 1924). University of Pennsylvania - Rare Book and Manuscript Library. Correspondence with Theodore Dreiser from Joseph T. Shipley, Dramatic Critic, Edward Levinson, Asst. Editor, and Ben Blumberg, Advertising Dept., New Leader. Periodical published by New Leader Pub. Association. Archive registered with ArchiveGrid.
Correspondence, 1923 - 44 - Joseph Shipley/ Allen Tate (Container List. Box 1 Fugitive Materials. 10. The Fugitive) SPECIAL COLLECTIONS Jean and Alexander Heard Library Vanderbilt University, Fugitive and Agrarian Collection Addition. MSS 622 Arranged and described in Spring/Summer 2010, Vanderbilt University Special Collections and University Archives.

1893 births
1988 deaths
American theater critics
Linguists from the United States
Columbia University alumni
City College of New York alumni
City College of New York faculty
Yeshiva University faculty
American academics of English literature
Etymologists
American art critics
20th-century American translators
Brooklyn College faculty
20th-century linguists